Minister of Supply and Services was an office in the Cabinet of Canada from 1969 to 1996. On July 12, 1996, office of the Minister of Supply and Services and the office of the Minister of Public Works were abolished and replaced with the office of Minister of Public Works and Government Services.

Ministers

References

Supply and Services